The Bulgarian Figure Skating Championships are the figure skating national championship held annually to determine the national champions of Bulgaria. Skaters compete in the disciplines of men's singles, ladies' singles, and ice dancing, although not every discipline is held every year due to a lack of participants. The event is organized by the Bulgarian Skating Federation.

History
Bulgaria's national governing body was established on 16 September 1949 and initially included ice hockey. The first Bulgarian figure skaters to compete internationally were Aleksandr Penchev, at the 1966 Winter Universiade, and Emil Dimitrov, at the 1966 Prague Skate. Bulgaria joined the International Skating Union in 1967.

Evelina Panova competed at the inaugural World Junior Championships (1976). Over the next seven years Bulgaria debuted at the European Championships in three disciplines — Margarita Dimitrova in ladies' singles (1979), Boyko Aleksiev in men's singles (1980), Hristina Boyanova / Yavor Ivanov in ice dancing (1983). In 1984, Boyanova/Ivanov became the first figure skaters to represent Bulgaria at the Olympics. A year later, figure skating and ice hockey split into separate federations.

Senior medalists

Men

Ladies

Pairs

Ice dance

Junior medalists

Men

Ladies

References

External links
 Bulgarian Skating Federation

 
Figure skating national championships
Figure Skating